William Bertram (11 January 1875 – 11 June 1957) was an Australian politician. He was the Labor member for Maree in the Legislative Assembly of Queensland from 1912 to 1929. He served as Speaker of the Legislative Assembly of Queensland from 1920 to 1929. His grandson, Harold Lowes, was a Liberal member of the Legislative Assembly from 1974 to 1977.

References

1875 births
1957 deaths
Members of the Queensland Legislative Assembly
Speakers of the Queensland Legislative Assembly
Place of birth missing
Australian Labor Party members of the Parliament of Queensland